Édouard Molinaro (13 May 1928 – 7 December 2013) was a French film director and screenwriter.

Biography

He was born in Bordeaux, Gironde.

He is best known for his comedies with Louis de Funès (Oscar, Hibernatus), My Uncle Benjamin (with Jacques Brel and Claude Jade), Dracula and Son (with Christopher Lee), and the Academy Award-nominated La Cage aux Folles (with Michel Serrault and Ugo Tognazzi). Molinaro was active as a director until a few years before his death, although after 1985 he had almost exclusively been producing works for television.

In 1996, his cinematic work was awarded the René Clair Award, a prize given by the Académie française for excellent film work.

Molinaro died of a respiratory insufficiency in 2013. He was 85.

Filmography (as director)
Les Alchimistes (1957, short)
 (Back to the Wall, Evidence in Concrete, 1958) — based on a novel by Frédéric Dard
 (The Road to Shame, 1959) — based on a novel by 
 (Witness in the City, 1959) — screenplay by Boileau-Narcejac
 (A Lover for the Summer, A Mistress for the Summer, 1960) — based on a novel by Maurice Clavel
The Passion of Slow Fire (1961) — based on a novel by Georges Simenon
 (Touch of Treason, 1962) — based on a novel by 
The Seven Deadly Sins (1962, anthology film)
 (Arsene Lupin vs. Arsene Lupin, 1962) — Arsène Lupin sequel
Une ravissante idiote (Agent 38-24-36, The Ravishing Idiot, 1964) — based on a novel by Charles Exbrayat
Male Hunt (1964)
 (When the Pheasants Pass, 1965)
To Commit a Murder (1967) — based on a novel by Jacques Robert
Oscar (1967) — based on a play by 
Hibernatus (1969) — based on a play by Jean Bernard-Luc
Mon oncle Benjamin (My Uncle Benjamin, 1969) — based on a novel by Claude Tillier
 (1970) — based on a novel by Jacques Perry
 (The Most Gentle Confessions, 1971) — based on a play by Georges Arnaud
 (Sweet Deception, 1972) — based on a novel by Christine de Rivoyre
 (The Hostage Gang, 1973)
L'Emmerdeur (A Pain in the A..., 1973) — screenplay by Francis Veber
 (The Irony of Chance, 1974) — based on a novel by Paul Guimard
: Un jour comme les autres avec des cacahuètes (1974, TV series episode)
 (The Pink Telephone, 1975) — screenplay by Francis Veber
Dracula and Son (1976) — Dracula parody
Man in a Hurry (1977) — based on the novel The Man in a Hurry by Paul Morand
: Le Dossier Françoise Muller (1978, TV series episode)
 (1978, TV miniseries) — based on the Claudine novels by Colette
La Cage aux folles (1978) — screenplay by Francis Veber, based on the play La Cage aux Folles by Jean Poiret
Il était un musicien: Monsieur Strauss (1979, TV series episode)
 (1979) — screenplay by Francis Veber, based on a novel by Peter Marks
La Pitié dangereuse (1979, TV film) — based on Beware of Pity by Stefan Zweig
Sunday Lovers (1980, anthology film) — screenplay by Francis Veber
La Cage aux Folles II (1980) — screenplay by Francis Veber, sequel to La Cage aux Folles
Au bon beurre (1981, TV film) — based on The Best Butter by Jean Dutourd
Pour cent briques, t'as plus rien... (For 200 Grand, You Get Nothing Now, 1982) — based on a play by 
 (1983, TV film) — based on a novel by Armand Lanoux
Just the Way You Are (1984)
 (1985)
 (Love on the Quiet, 1985)
Le Tiroir secret (1986, TV miniseries)
Un métier du seigneur (TV film) — based on A Noble Profession by Pierre Boulle
L'Ivresse de la métamorphose (1988, TV miniseries) — based on The Post Office Girl by Stefan Zweig
Door on the Left as You Leave the Elevator (1988) — based on a play by Gérard Lauzier
La Ruelle au clair de lune (1988, TV film) — based on Moonbeam Alley by Stefan Zweig
Manon Roland (1989, TV film) — biographical film about Madame Roland
Les Grandes Familles (1989, TV miniseries) — based on a novel by Maurice Druon
: La Peau du gorille (1990, TV series episode)
 (1991, TV film) — based on a novella by Arthur Schnitzler
Coup de foudre: Résurgence (1992, TV series episode)
Coup de foudre: Grand, beau et brun (1992, TV series episode)
La Femme abandonnée (1992, TV film) — based on The Deserted Woman by Honoré de Balzac
The Supper (1992) — based on a play by Jean-Claude Brisville
Ce que savait Maisie (1995, TV film) — based on What Maisie Knew by Henry James
Beaumarchais (1996) — biographical film about Beaumarchais, based on a play by Sacha Guitry
H (1998–1999, TV series, 14 episodes)
Nora (1999, TV film) — based on Watch and Ward by Henry James
 (1999, TV film)
Nana (2001, TV film) — loosely based on Nana by Émile Zola
 (2003, TV film)
Navarro: Double meurtre (2005, TV series episode)
 (2005, TV film)
 (2005–2006, TV series, 3 episodes)
Navarro: Manipulation (2005, TV series episode)
 (2005–2008, TV series, 5 episodes)
Dirty Slapping (2008, TV short film)

References

External links

1928 births
2013 deaths
French film directors
French male screenwriters
French screenwriters
French television directors
French people of Italian descent
Mass media people from Bordeaux
Deaths from respiratory failure